Fowlerville is a small hamlet in the town of Concord, in southern Erie County, New York, United States.

It should not be confused with other New York hamlets named Fowlerville in Livingston County and Sullivan County, or with the similarly named hamlet of Fowlersville in Lewis County.

Geography
Fowlerville is located at  (42.6022831, -78.7166947) in Erie County.

References

Hamlets in New York (state)
Hamlets in Erie County, New York